The Rove Tunnel (French: Tunnel du Rove) is a currently out-of-use canal tunnel in Southern France that connected the 16th arrondissement of Marseille to the Étang de Berre in the Bouches-du-Rhône department from 1927 to 1963. It allowed for waterway transport avoiding the Mediterranean Sea towards the Rhône within the larger Canal de Marseille au Rhône. With a length of  it was a major work of civil engineering; it remains the longest canal tunnel in the world.

Description
The tunnel was the most challenging section of the Canal de Marseille au Rhône, which connected Marseille to the Rhône river.

The tunnel starts near the village of Le Rove; it provides a sea level passage through the  maximum altitude . It remains the biggest canal tunnel in the world, as far as shipping canals are concerned. As a part of the Canal de Marseille au Rhône, it used to connect the Étang de Berre in the north with L'Estaque in the south, both hosting a part of Marseille's industrial harbour.

History
The possibility of building a canal tunnel had been discussed for many years. A proposal was developed for the Marseille Chamber of Commerce in 1879 by the engineer Guérard, but no action was taken until an act of 24 December 1903 authorised the project. Preparatory work began in 1906.

Underground work began in 1910, using compressed air hammers to break through the rock. The contractor simultaneously worked from the south and from the north, and on a ventilation tunnel. Geological studies had not indicated any aquifer, but in fact the work was seriously affected by various irruptions of water. Work accelerated after the declaration of World War I on 1 August 1914. The labourers included Spanish and Portuguese nationals, who replaced Italians recalled to their country at the outbreak of war, as well as German prisoners of war.

On 7 May 1916 Marcel Sembat, Minister of Public Works, accompanied by Joseph Thierry, Undersecretary of State for War, inaugurated the Rove Tunnel and the first two cranes of Port-de-Bouc. After many delays, the full canal was finally opened to traffic on 25 April 1927. Water had been flowing through it since 1925.

It was closed in 1963 after a section of the tunnel collapsed.

References

Sources

Canal tunnels in France
Tunnels completed in 1927
Transport in Marseille